WABA NBL for season 2007–08 was the seventh season of WABA League. The study included tens teams from five countries, a champion for the third time in team history became Šibenik Jolly.  In this season participating clubs from Serbia, Montenegro, Bosnia and Herzegovina, Croatia and from Slovenia.

WABA NBL for season 2007–08 has begun to play 27 October 2007 and ended on 17 March 2008, when he it was completed a Regular season. Final Four to be played from 21–22 March 2008. in Šibenik, Croatia. Winner Final Four this season for the team Šibenik Jolly.

Team information

Regular season
The League of the season was played with 10 teams and play a dual circuit system, each with each one game at home and away. The four best teams at the end of the regular season were placed in the Final Four. The regular season began on 27 October 2007 and it will end on 17 March 2008.

Final four
Final Four to be played from 21–22 March 2008. in the Gradska Skolska Sportska Dvorana in Gospić, Croatia.

External links
 2007–08 WABA NBL at eurobasket.com

2007-08
2007–08 in European women's basketball leagues
2007–08 in Serbian basketball
2007–08 in Bosnia and Herzegovina basketball
2007–08 in Slovenian basketball
2007–08 in Montenegrin basketball
2007–08 in Croatian basketball